Carla Howell (born 1955) is an American politician, small government advocate and activist. She was the Libertarian Party of Massachusetts candidate for Massachusetts State Auditor in 1998, U.S. Senate in 2000, and Governor in 2002. She then served in multiple leadership positions in the U.S. Libertarian Party. She has also organized tax-cut initiative ballot measures in Massachusetts and worked for the Libertarian National Committee.

Early life and education 
Howell is the daughter of Carla (Winsor) Howell and Charles Howell, the third of their five children. She is a great-granddaughter of William Eustis Russell, a former Governor of the Commonwealth of Massachusetts. Her father worked as a business executive and her mother engaged in volunteer work in the community. As a result of her father's work, the family moved from Massachusetts, and Howell attended high school in Detroit and Pittsburgh, graduating from Fox Chapel High School in Pittsburgh at age 16. 

Howell attended Bethany College in West Virginia for mathematics and computer science, and after graduating, became a systems engineer at Westinghouse Electric. In 1981, she began work at Computervision and became the head of an engineering division in 1984. After a decade of engineering work, she then became a consultant in the Boston area for the high-tech and health care industry.

Howell earned her MBA from Babson College in Wellesley, Massachusetts in 1986.

Political career
In 1994, Howell joined the Libertarian Party of Massachusetts and she was elected chair of the state party in 1997. In 1998, she ran for Massachusetts State Auditor on the Libertarian Party ticket, and was endorsed by the Boston Herald. She received 102,198 votes, 5.3 percent of the total, which according to the Associated Press, "guarantee[d] the party's official status."

In 2000, Howell was the Libertarian candidate for U.S. Senate in Massachusetts against Edward M. Kennedy. She ran with a "Small government is beautiful" campaign slogan, and by October, had raised almost $700,000, while the Republican candidate had raised about $20,000. She placed third, with more than 308,000 votes, which was 12 percent of the total and one percent behind the Republican candidate. In 2001, while reporting on the Massachusetts Libertarian Party convention, Rick Klein of the Boston Globe wrote the 2000 election "made Howell the state party's standard-bearer - and something of a hero to Bay State Libertarians" and reported she received standing ovations before and after her speech to the attendees.

In 2002, Howell was the Libertarian candidate for Massachusetts Governor. At the time of her campaign, she was the chair of the Committee For Small Government. Her campaign platform included a plan to reduce the state budget by half, support for gun rights, and a repeal of the state income tax. She was excluded along with other minor candidates from a gubernatorial candidate debate, and their requests for an injunction were denied. She received 23,044 votes, more than 1 percent of the total.

By 2012, Howell was the executive director of the U.S. Libertarian Party. In 2016, she worked as the political director for the national party.

She was a staff member in the Libertarian National Committee from December 2011 until June 2017.

Ballot initiatives 
Howell spearheaded initiatives to repeal the Massachusetts state personal income tax in 2002 and 2008. In 2002, she sponsored 2002 Statewide Ballot Question 1, an initiative petition to end the income tax in Massachusetts. The measure received 45% of the vote, which Peter DeMarco, writing for the Boston Globe, described as "eye-popping".

In 2007, Howell and co-chair Michael Cloud, re-established the Committee For Small Government. The Committee obtained enough petition signatures to put the issue on the ballot as Statewide Ballot Question 1. The 2008 initiative differed from the 2002 initiative in that it provided a one-year transition period with a tax rate of 2.65% before the tax rate would drop to zero. This measure received a higher vote total than in 2002, but lost with 30% of the vote.

In 2010, Howell filed four petitions to create ballot measures to reduce sales taxes, and Republican Christy Mihos, who was running for Massachusetts governor at the time, also sponsored the initiatives. Howell headed the Alliance to Roll Back Taxes, sponsor of a ballot initiative to cut the Massachusetts sales tax from 6.25% to 3.0%, which was on November 2, 2010, ballot as Question 3.  Her group collected and submitted 74,131 approved voter signatures in the fall of 2009, and another 14,023 signatures in the spring-summer of 2010 to qualify the measure. The measure reached as high as 56% in the polls but was unsuccessful.

See also
 2008 Massachusetts Question 1
 Tax revolt, political struggle to repeal, limit, or roll back a government-imposed tax
 Tax resistance

References

External links
 Carla Howell official web site
 Affiliations:
  audio interview on All Rise
 Alliance to Roll Back Taxes ballot initiative website
 Committee For Small Government ballot initiative website
 The Center for Small Government
 US Libertarian Party web site
 Downloadable audio interview with Free Talk Live
 

1955 births
Living people
American people of Welsh descent
American women in business
Babson College alumni
Massachusetts Libertarians
Women in Massachusetts politics
21st-century American women